Cole Harbour—Eastern Passage was a provincial electoral district in  Nova Scotia, Canada, that elected one member of the Nova Scotia House of Assembly.

The district was created in 1992 from Cole Harbour.

In 2003, the district lost an area south of the Circumferential Highway and the eastern side of Morris Lake to Dartmouth South, and lost an area south of Portland Street to Cole Harbour.

In 2013, the district gained the area south of Russell Lake and east of Highway 111 from Dartmouth South-Portland Valley.

The district was abolished at the 2021 Nova Scotia general election, mostly into Eastern Passage and parts of Cole Harbour-Dartmouth and Cole Harbour.

Members of the Legislative Assembly
This riding has elected the following Members of the Legislative Assembly:

Election results

|-
 
|Liberal
|Joyce Treen
|align="right"|3,057
|align="right"|40.62
|align="right"|+25.02
|-
 
|New Democratic Party
|Becky Kent
|align="right"|2,914
|align="right"|38.72
|align="right"|-26.45
|-
 
|Progressive Conservative
|Lloyd Jackson
|align="right"|1,555
|align="right"|20.66
|align="right"|+4.76

|}

|-
 
|New Democratic Party
|Becky Kent
|align="right"|4,402
|align="right"|65.17
|align="right"|+20.78
|-
 
|Progressive Conservative
|Lloyd Jackson
|align="right"|1,074
|align="right"|15.90
|align="right"|-17.73
|-
 
|Liberal
|Orest Ulan
|align="right"|1,054
|align="right"|15.60
|align="right"|-1.70
|-

|}

|-
 
|New Democratic Party
|Becky Kent
|align="right"|2,459
|align="right"|44.39
|align="right"|-20.01
|-
 
|Progressive Conservative
|Michael Eddy
|align="right"|1,863
|align="right"|33.63
|align="right"|+14.71
|-

|-

|}

|-
 
|New Democratic Party
|Kevin Deveaux
|align="right"|3,997
|align="right"|58.44
|align="right"|+19.17
|-
 
|Progressive Conservative
|Harry McInroy
|align="right"|1,641
|align="right"|23.99
|align="right"|-13.36
|-
 
|Liberal
|Brian Churchill
|align="right"|1,121
|align="right"|16.39
|align="right"|-6.99

|}

|-
 
|New Democratic Party
|Kevin Deveaux
|align="right"|3,721
|align="right"|39.27
|align="right"|-
|-
 
|Progressive Conservative
|Nadune Cooper Mont
|align="right"|3,539
|align="right"|37.35
|align="right"|-
|-
 
|Liberal
|Colin MacEachern
|align="right"|2,216
|align="right"|23.38
|align="right"|-
|}

|-
 
|New Democratic Party
|Kevin Deveaux
|align="right"|4,411
|align="right"|45.73
|align="right"|-
|-
 
|Progressive Conservative
|Randy Anstey
|align="right"|3,303
|align="right"|34.24
|align="right"|-
|-
 
|Liberal
|Linda DeGrace
|align="right"|1,931
|align="right"|20.02
|align="right"|-
|}

|-
 
|Liberal
|Dennis Richards
|align="right"|4,702
|align="right"|48.13
|align="right"|-
|-
 
|Progressive Conservative
|John Gold
|align="right"|3,409
|align="right"|34.89
|align="right"|-
|-
 
|New Democratic Party
|Ash Shaihk
|align="right"|1,501
|align="right"|15.36
|align="right"|-
|-
 
|Natural Law Party
|Helen Creighton
|align="right"|158
|align="right"|1.62
|align="right"|-
|}

References

External links
2003 riding profile
2006 riding profile
June 13, 2006 Nova Scotia Provincial General Election Poll By Poll Results

Former provincial electoral districts of Nova Scotia
Politics of Halifax, Nova Scotia